Denis Romanenco (born 18 November 1974) is a former Moldovan professional footballer. He played as a goalkeeper.

Club career
He holds the Moldavian domestic record for going 1154 minutes without concedinga goal, in the 1998–99 title winning season.

International career
Before becoming second choice goalkeeper for the UEFA Euro 2004 qualifying, Romanenco played 6 games for the 2002 FIFA World Cup qualification.

Personal life
Denis Romanenco was one of the 11 Moldovian football players challenged and beaten by Tony Hawkes and features in his book Playing the Moldovans at Tennis.

External links

1974 births
Living people
Moldovan footballers
Moldova international footballers
Expatriate footballers in Russia
Expatriate footballers in Kazakhstan
Association football goalkeepers
FC Dacia Chișinău players
FC Zimbru Chișinău players
Moldovan Super Liga players
Moldovan expatriate sportspeople in Kazakhstan
FC Mashuk-KMV Pyatigorsk players
FC Dynamo Makhachkala players